Valle Vista Mall is a regional shopping mall located in Harlingen, Texas, off Interstate 2 (Expressway 83) at the intersection of Dixieland Road and Tyler Avenue. It has  of gross leasable area. It is anchored by Big Lots, Dillard's, Gold's Gym, J. C. Penney, Urban Air, and Rack Room Shoes with one vacant anchor last occupied by Sears.

In 2017 Forever 21 closed its location for good, On October 15, 2018, it was announced that Sears would be closing as part of a plan to close 142 stores nationwide., in 2019 Urban Air Trampoline Park replaced the former Forever 21.

References

Shopping malls in Texas
Shopping malls established in 1983
Buildings and structures in Harlingen, Texas
1983 establishments in Texas
Kohan Retail Investment Group